The Children's Museum of Taipei (CMOT) was a children's museum in Taipei, Taiwan. The museum opened on December 16, 2005, and closed on November 5, 2008.

The museum featured five themes: science, art, nature, culture, and toddlers' exploration.

External links 
 Children's Museum of Taipei — About CMOT

2005 establishments in Taiwan
2008 disestablishments in Taiwan
Former buildings and structures in Taiwan
Defunct museums
Museums established in 2005